Jenny is a 1936 French drama film, the first full-length feature by Marcel Carné and the first of his successful collaborations with the dialogue writer Jacques Prévert and the composer Joseph Kosma. The leading roles are taken by Françoise Rosay, Albert Préjean, Charles Vanel, and Lisette Lanvin. It tells the story of a middle-aged woman in Paris who with underworld support has built up a smart night club, but her life starts falling apart when the young gangster she maintains as her lover falls in love with her daughter. At times the film moves into the realm of poetic realism, where the cinematography, music and dialogue infuse the lives and surroundings of ordinary people with poetry.

Plot
After years working in London, Jenny's daughter Danielle falls out with her boy friend and decides to go back to her mother in Paris. This throws Jenny into confusion, as she has to move out of her elegant house in an exclusive suburb and hastily rent a flat. The house, bought with money from the gangster Benoît who would like to be her lover, is called a night club but is really somewhere for well-off men to meet prostitutes. The last thing Jenny wants is for her daughter to find out about the sordid club or about the young lover she maintains, a gangster called Lucien. Danielle soon becomes puzzled about phone calls and visitors, which lead her to think that the business which keeps her mother out all night may not be wholly legitimate.

One evening she turns up at the club alone and from behind a curtain sees enough to understand how her mother makes a living. While hiding she is molested by an over-eager customer, from whom she is rescued by a young man who rushes her outside. This is Lucien, and the two are at once struck with each other. While he admits freely that he is a criminal, neither mentions their link to Jenny. Leaving her mother, Danielle goes to live with Lucien and the two plan to move to London. Lucien then tells Jenny honestly that he is leaving her, which leaves the coast clear for Benoît, whose gangsters beat up Lucien. Jenny visits him in hospital, and has to hide quickly when Danielle comes in. Having lost daughter and lover, Jenny walks home reflecting on life's ups and downs.

Cast
 Françoise Rosay as Jenny Gauthier, night club owner 
 Albert Préjean as Lucien Dancret, her young lover  
 Lisette Lanvin as Danielle Bricart, her daughter  
 Charles Vanel as Benoît, gangster
 Roland Toutain as Xavier, friend of Lucien  
 Sylvia Bataille as Florence, singer at the night club
 Jean-Louis Barrault as Le Dromadaire, gangster
 Robert Le Vigan as L'Albinos, customer at the night club
 Margo Lion as Madame Vrack, manager of the night club
 Joseph Kosma as harmonium player

About the film
The film's sets were designed by the art director Jean d'Eaubonne.

References

Bibliography 
 Andrews, Dudley. Mists of Regret: Culture and Sensibility in Classic French Film. Princeton University Press, 1995.

External links 
 

1936 films
French drama films
1936 drama films
1930s French-language films
Films directed by Marcel Carné
French black-and-white films
Films scored by Joseph Kosma
1930s French films